Five & Two Pictures is an independent Christian film production company founded in 2002 by Dave Christiano and Rich Christiano. They have produced several Christian feature films; Time Changer, Unidentified, Me & You, Us, Forever, The Secrets of Jonathan Sperry and A Matter of Faith.

History 
Five & Two Pictures was founded by Dave Christiano and Rich Christiano in 2002 with their first theatrical release, Time Changer. The time travel movie opened on October 25, 2002 in 169 theaters and eventually played in 310. On April 28, 2006, Five and Two Pictures released their second film, a drama about UFOs entitled, Unidentified. This was a smaller platform release, opening in 6 theaters and eventually playing in 85.

On February 15, 2008, Five & Two Pictures released film number three, a love story, Me & You, Us, Forever in 83 theaters. Their fourth film, The Secrets of Jonathan Sperry, is a period piece set in 1970. It opened in 118 theaters on September 18, 2009 and ended up playing in 313.

List of films

References

External links 
 
 Five & Two Pictures at Box Office Mojo

Mass media companies established in 2002
Christian mass media companies
Film production companies of the United States
Christian film production companies
2002 establishments in the United States
American companies established in 2002